Catopyrops is a genus of butterflies in the family Lycaenidae. The range extends from India to the Malay Archipelago and the Solomon Islands.

Species
Catopyrops ancyra (Felder, 1860) – many subspecies
Catopyrops florinda (Butler, 1877)
Catopyrops holtra Parsons, 1986 New Britain
Catopyrops keiria (Druce, 1891)
Catopyrops kokopona (Ribbe, 1899)
Catopyrops nebulosa (Druce, 1892) New Hebrides
Catopyrops rita (Grose-Smith, 1895)
Catopyrops zyx Parsons, 1986 Solomon Islands, New Guinea

References

External links
"Catopyrops Toxopeus, 1929" at Markku Savela's Lepidoptera and Some Other Life Forms
Images representing Catopyrops  at Bold

Further reading
French Wikipedia provides additional subspecies and distribution information at "Le genre Catopyrops".

 
Lycaenidae genera
Taxa named by Lambertus Johannes Toxopeus